Hands Down is a 1918 American silent Western film directed by Rupert Julian and starring Monroe Salisbury, W.H. Bainbridge and Ruth Clifford.

Cast
 Monroe Salisbury as Dago Sam
 W.H. Bainbridge as Dan Stuyvesant
 Ruth Clifford as Hilda Stuyvesant
 Rupert Julian as Tom Flynn
 Rita Pickering as Marina
 Al W. Filson as Jack Dedlow

References

Bibliography
 James Robert Parish & Michael R. Pitts. Film directors: a guide to their American films. Scarecrow Press, 1974.

External links
 

1918 films
1918 Western (genre) films
American black-and-white films
Universal Pictures films
Films directed by Rupert Julian
Silent American Western (genre) films
1910s English-language films
1910s American films